Santo Calegari  (1662–1717) was an Italian sculptor of the late Baroque period who was mainly active in Brescia. 

He trained with Alessandro Algardi. His son, Alessandro (1698–1777), was also a sculptor.

The statue of Angela Merici was erected in the main square of Desenzano del Garda in 1772, by Gelfino Calegari.

References

1662 births
1717 deaths
Artists from Brescia
17th-century Italian sculptors
Italian male sculptors
18th-century Italian sculptors
Italian Baroque sculptors
18th-century Italian male artists